Three from Variety (German: Drei vom Varieté) is a 1954 West German drama film directed by Kurt Neumann and starring Ingrid Andree, Peter Pasetti and Paul Dahlke. It is based on the 1912 novel The Oath of Stephan Huller by Felix Hollaender which has inspired a number of film adaptations. The plot revolves around a love triangle around a high wire circus act.

The film's sets were designed by the art directors Ernst H. Albrecht and Paul Markwitz. It was shot at the Göttingen Studios.

Cast
 Ingrid Andree as Jeanine Wagner
 Peter Pasetti as Luigi Borella
 Paul Dahlke as Stobrowski, Agent
 Mady Rahl as Valerie Latour
 Erich Schellow as Alexis Wagner
 Franco Andrei as Renato Oscar
 Heinz Engelmann as  Charles Latour
 Walter Janssen as Timm Broders
 Willy Maertens as Gerichtsvorsitzender
 Günther Jerschke as Schumann, Inspizient
 Eugen Dumont as Mahnke, Pförtner
 Oskar Dimroth as Prosecutor
 Kurt Fuß as Zirkusdirektor
 Holger Hagen as Artist mit Affe
 Robert Meyn as Jeanine's defense lawyer
 Karin Remsing as Vera, Artistin
 Fritz Schmiedel
 Gert Schäfer
 Paul Hühn
 Eberhard Itzenplitz

References

Bibliography
 Bock, Hans-Michael & Bergfelder, Tim. The Concise CineGraph. Encyclopedia of German Cinema. Berghahn Books, 2009.

External links 
 

1954 films
1954 drama films
German drama films
West German films
1950s German-language films
Films directed by Kurt Neumann
Circus films
Remakes of German films
German black-and-white films
1950s German films
Films shot at Göttingen Studios